Ellen Marianne Mattsson Jelinek (born December 5, 1973 in Sollentuna, Stockholm County) is a Swedish actress.

Mattsson studied at Swedish National Academy of Mime and Acting 2000–04. She has been engaged at Teater Västmanland, Göta Lejon and the Royal Dramatic Theatre.

Selected filmography
Cockpit (2012)
Perrongen (2009)
Maria Wern – Främmande fågel (2008)
Vi hade i alla fall tur med vädret – igen (2008)
Den nya människan (2007)
Underbar och älskad av alla (2007)
En uppstoppad hund (2006)
LasseMajas detektivbyrå (TV series) (2006)
AK3 (2006)
2010 (2006)
Wallander - Innan frosten (2005)
Harrys döttrar (2005)
Lovisa och Carl Michael (2005)

References

External links
Ellen Mattsson on the Royal Dramatic Theatre's website

Actresses from Stockholm
Swedish film actresses
Swedish stage actresses
Swedish television actresses
Living people
1973 births
21st-century Swedish actresses